Philip Wilkinson (born 1955) is the author of non-fiction books for children and adults.  He was educated at Corpus Christi College, Oxford.  He worked as an editor prior to becoming an author.

He specialises in works on history, the arts, religion, and architecture and has written over forty titles. Wilkinson wrote an important work on the Romans. He now lives in Gloucestershire.

Selected works
Amazing Buildings (1993)
Building (1997)
Illustrated Dictionary of Religions (1999)
The Shock of the Old  (2001)
What the Romans Did For Us (2001)
The Best-Ever Book of Ships (2002)
The Kingfisher World Atlas (2003)
Encyclopedia of Religion (with Rabbi Douglas Channing, 2004)
Food and Farming: Feeding an Expanding World (Ideas & Inventions Series) (2005)
Gandhi: The Young Protestor Who Founded a Nation (National Geographic World History Biographies) (2005)
Gandhi (QED Great Lives Series) (2005)
Generating Power (Ideas & Inventions Series) (2005)
Life and D
Yangtze (2005)
The English Buildings Book (with Peter Ashley, 2006)
English Abbeys: Monastic Buildings and Culture (2006)
Religions (2008)
Ships: History, Battles, Discovery, Navigation
Phantom Architecture (2017)

See also

  List of children's non-fiction writers

References

External links
 Philip Wilkinson Official Site

British non-fiction writers
British children's writers
Living people
1956 births
Alumni of Corpus Christi College, Oxford
British male writers
Male non-fiction writers